Specklinia brighamella is a species of orchid plant native to Panama.

References 

brighamella
Flora of Panama